Joël Blomqvist may refer to:
 Joël Blomqvist (hymnwriter)
 Joel Blomqvist (ice hockey)